Century Plyboards (India) Ltd. is an Indian manufacturer, seller and exporter of plywoods, laminates, doors, PVCs and veneers. The company offers plywood products under the brand name, Century Ply, and exports its products to over 20 countries. Spread into a 6.6 acre area, the company’s plant is located at Bishnupur, near Joka, Kolkata. Century Plyboards started the commercial production of MDF (Medium Density Fibre) at its newly set-up unit at Punjab recently. Century Ply (Singapore) Pte. Ltd., a subsidiary of Century Plyboards, has acquired 49% stake in Huesoulin Wood Processing Factory Co. Ltd., making it as its associate company.

History
Century Plyboard was founded in 1986 by Sajjan Bhajanka and Sanjay Agarwal in Kolkata. In 2013, the company launched its furniture stores under the sub-brand ‘Nesta’. In the same year, the company launched its subsidiary company Century Infotech. In 2015, Century Ply (Singapore) Pte. Ltd., a subsidiary of Century Plyboards (India) Ltd in Singapore incorporated Century Ply Laos Co. Ltd. in Laos. The company began its manufacturing facilities near Kolkata, Karnal, Guwahati, Hoshiarpur, Kandla and Chennai and opened stores in many parts of India. It became the first company to receive ISO 9002 certification for veneer and plywood. Its subsidiary Century Infra was incorporated on December 30 2021.

EV Delivery Vans
Century Plyboards launched a pilot project of EV delivery vans in July 2022. The vans are claimed to reduce carbon emissions by 17-30%.

Chairman
Sajjan Bhajanka is the Founder of Century Plyboards (India) Ltd. and has been serving as its chairman since October 31, 2011. He serves as the Chairman of Star Ferro and Cement Limited, Century Plyboards Ltd. and Shyam Century Ferrous Limited.

Board of Directors
Sanjay Agarwal is the Promoter and MD of Century Ply Boards (India) Ltd. He is also the Promoter and Director of Star Cement and a key member of the executive committee of Indian Chamber of Commerce, Member of Confederation of Indian Industry (East) and Member of Young Presidents Organization GOLD (Kolkata). Sunil Mitra, Debanjan Mandal, and Vijay Chhibber serve as Directors while Nikita Bansal and Keshav Bhajanka serve as Executive Directors of the company. In addition, the company has 11 other board members.

Awards
CenturyPly is the first ISO 9002 company in India for Veneer and Plywood. In 2012, the company won Alumni Achievement Awards; Cool Tool Award 2012 Winner, and Network Marketing Awards. In 2022, Century Plyboards (India) Ltd won E4m Pride of India Brands Honors.

CSR activities
In November 2019, Century Ply donated INR 2 lakh to Tata Medical Center for the treatment of underprivileged patients of breast cancer.

In July 2021, the company pledged to plant 10,000 trees across West Bengal and Haryana as part of Van Mahotsav.

In October 2021, the company launched a campaign called ‘CenturyPly Heroes 2021’ to encourage people towards organ donation.

References

Manufacturing companies established in 1986
Furniture companies of India
Plywood
Manufacturing companies based in Kolkata
Indian brands
1986 establishments in West Bengal
Indian companies established in 1986